This is a list of persons whose names are in Algonquian languages.

A
Andaigweos
Assacumet
Awashonks
Aysh-ke-bah-ke-ko-zhay

B
Beshekee
Biauswah
Buckongahelas

C
Canonchet
Canonicus
Chanco
Cheeseekau
Chicagou
Comas
Corbitant
Custaloga

D
Debedeavon

E
Egushawa
Epenow

G
Gelelemend
Gomo

H
Hobomok

I
Iyannough

K
Katonah
Kechewaishke
Kennekuk
Keokuk
Kineubenae

L
Lappawinsoe
Lawoughqua

M
Ma-Ko-Ko-Mo
Mahackemo
Mamongazeda
Manteo
Masconomet
Massasoit
Match-E-Be-Nash-She-Wish
Mecosta
Medweganoonind
Memeskia
Menominee
Metacomet
Metallak
Metea
Miantonomoh
Moluntha
Monoco

N
Nahnebahwequa
Neaatooshing
Necotowance
Nemattanew
Nescambious
Chief Niwot

O
Opchanacanough
Oratam
Chief Oshkosh
Ozhaguscodaywayquay

P
Papakeecha
Passaconaway
Petosegay
Plausawa
Pocahontas
Powhatan

S
Senachewine
Senachwine
Shabbona
Shick Shack
Shaw-shaw-way-nay-beece
Shingabawossin
Shingas
Shingwauk
Squanto

T
Tacumwah
Tagwagane
Tamanend
Taphance
Tecumseh
Tomocomo
Totopotomoi
Tuhbenahneequay

U
Uncas

W
Wabanquot
Waubonsie
Wahbanosay
Wahunsunacock
Wainchemahdub
Wampage
Wamsutta
Wanchese
Wasson
Wequash
Watseka
Waubojeeg
Wawasee
Wawatam
Weetamoo
Weyapiersenwah
Weyonomon
Winamac
Wingina
Wonalancet
Wosso
Wyandanch

See also
List of English words from indigenous languages of th Americas#Words from Algonquian languages

Algonquian
Algonquian
Personal names